James Monroe (April 28, 1758July 4, 1831) was an American statesman, lawyer,  and diplomat who served as the fifth president of the United States from 1817 to 1825. A member of the Democratic-Republican Party, Monroe was the last president who was a Founding Father as well as the last president of the Virginia dynasty and the Republican Generation; his presidency coincided with the Era of Good Feelings, concluding the First Party System era of American politics. He is perhaps best known for issuing the Monroe Doctrine, a policy of opposing European colonialism in the Americas while effectively asserting U.S. dominance, empire, and hegemony in the hemisphere. He also served as governor of Virginia, a member of the United States Senate, U.S. ambassador to France and Britain, the seventh Secretary of State, and the eighth Secretary of War.

Born into a slave-owning planter family in Westmoreland County, Virginia, Monroe served in the Continental Army during the American Revolutionary War. After studying law under Thomas Jefferson from 1780 to 1783, he served as a delegate in the Continental Congress. As a delegate to the Virginia Ratifying Convention, Monroe opposed the ratification of the United States Constitution. In 1790, he won election to the Senate, where he became a leader of the Democratic-Republican Party. He left the Senate in 1794 to serve as President George Washington's ambassador to France but was recalled by Washington in 1796. Monroe won the election as Governor of Virginia in 1799 and strongly supported Jefferson's candidacy in the 1800 presidential election.

As President Jefferson's special envoy, Monroe helped negotiate the Louisiana Purchase, through which the United States nearly doubled in size. Monroe fell out with his longtime friend James Madison after Madison rejected the Monroe–Pinkney Treaty that Monroe negotiated with Britain. He unsuccessfully challenged Madison for the Democratic-Republican nomination in the 1808 presidential election, but in 1811 he joined Madison's administration as Secretary of State. During the later stages of the War of 1812, Monroe simultaneously served as Madison's Secretary of State and Secretary of War. Monroe's wartime leadership established him as Madison's heir apparent, and he easily defeated Federalist candidate Rufus King in the 1816 presidential election.

During Monroe's tenure as president, the Federalist Party collapsed as a national political force and Monroe was re-elected, virtually unopposed, in 1820. As president, Monroe signed the Missouri Compromise, which admitted Missouri as a slave state and banned slavery from territories north of the 36°30′ parallel. In foreign affairs, Monroe and Secretary of State John Quincy Adams favored a policy of conciliation with Britain and a policy of expansionism against the Spanish Empire. In the 1819 Adams–Onís Treaty with Spain, the United States secured Florida and established its western border with New Spain. In 1823, Monroe announced the United States' opposition to any European intervention in the recently independent countries of the Americas with the Monroe Doctrine, which became a landmark in American foreign policy. Monroe was a member of the American Colonization Society, which supported the colonization of Africa by freed slaves, and Liberia's capital of Monrovia is named in his honor.

Following his retirement in 1825, Monroe was plagued by financial difficulties, and died on July 4, 1831, in New York City — sharing a distinction with Presidents John Adams and Thomas Jefferson of dying on the anniversary of U.S independence. Historians have generally ranked him as an above-average president.

Early life
James Monroe was born April 28, 1758, in his parents' house in a wooded area of Westmoreland County, Virginia. The marked site is one mile from the unincorporated community known today as Monroe Hall, Virginia. The James Monroe Family Home Site was listed on the National Register of Historic Places in 1979. His father Spence Monroe (1727–1774) was a moderately prosperous planter and slave owner who also practiced carpentry. His mother Elizabeth Jones (1730–1772) married Spence Monroe in 1752 and they had five children: Elizabeth, James, Spence, Andrew, and Joseph Jones.

His paternal great-great-grandfather Patrick Andrew Monroe emigrated to America from Scotland in the mid-17th century, and was part of an ancient Scottish clan known as Clan Munro. In 1650 he patented a large tract of land in Washington Parish, Westmoreland County, Virginia. Monroe's mother was the daughter of James Jones, who immigrated from Wales and settled in nearby King George County, Virginia. Jones was a wealthy architect. Also among James Monroe's ancestors were French Huguenot immigrants, who came to Virginia in 1700.

At age 11, Monroe was enrolled in Campbelltown Academy, the lone school in the county. He attended this school only 11 weeks a year, as his labor was needed on the farm. During this time, Monroe formed a lifelong friendship with an older classmate, John Marshall. Monroe's mother died in 1772, and his father two years later. Though he inherited property, including slaves, from both of his parents, the 16-year-old Monroe was forced to withdraw from school to support his younger brothers. His childless maternal uncle, Joseph Jones, became a surrogate father to Monroe and his siblings. A member of the Virginia House of Burgesses, Jones took Monroe to the capital of Williamsburg, Virginia, and enrolled him in the College of William and Mary. Jones also introduced Monroe to important Virginians such as Thomas Jefferson, Patrick Henry, and George Washington. In 1774, opposition to the British government grew in the Thirteen Colonies in reaction to the "Intolerable Acts", and Virginia sent a delegation to the First Continental Congress. Monroe became involved in the opposition to Lord Dunmore, the colonial governor of Virginia, and took part in the storming of the Governor's Palace.

Revolutionary War service
In early 1776, about a year and a half after his enrollment, Monroe dropped out of college and joined the 3rd Virginia Regiment in the Continental Army. As the fledgling army valued literacy in its officers, Monroe was commissioned with the rank of lieutenant, serving under Captain William Washington. After months of training, Monroe and 700 Virginia infantrymen were called north to serve in the New York and New Jersey campaign. Shortly after the Virginians arrived, George Washington led the army in a retreat from New York City into New Jersey and then across the Delaware River into Pennsylvania. In late December, Monroe took part in a surprise attack on a Hessian encampment at the Battle of Trenton. Though the attack was successful, Monroe suffered a severed artery in the battle and nearly died. In the aftermath, Washington cited Monroe and William Washington for their bravery, and promoted Monroe to captain. After his wounds healed, Monroe returned to Virginia to recruit his own company of soldiers. His participation in the battle was memorialized in John Trumbull's painting The Capture of the Hessians at Trenton, December 26, 1776 as well as Emanuel Leutze's 1851 Washington Crossing the Delaware.

Lacking the wealth to induce soldiers to join his company, Monroe instead asked his uncle to return him to the front. Monroe was assigned to the staff of General William Alexander, Lord Stirling. During this time he formed a close friendship with the Marquis de Lafayette, a French volunteer who encouraged him to view the war as part of a wider struggle against religious and political tyranny. Monroe served in the Philadelphia campaign and spent the winter of 1777–78 at the encampment of Valley Forge, sharing a log hut with Marshall. After serving in the Battle of Monmouth, the destitute Monroe resigned his commission in December 1778 and joined his uncle in Philadelphia. After the British captured Savannah, the Virginia legislature decided to raise four regiments, and Monroe returned to his native state, hoping to receive his own command. With letters of recommendation from Washington, Stirling, and Alexander Hamilton, Monroe received a commission as a lieutenant colonel and was expected to lead one of the regiments, but recruitment again proved to be a problem. On Jones's advice, Monroe returned to Williamsburg to study law, becoming a protege of Virginia Governor Thomas Jefferson.

With the British increasingly focusing their operations in the Southern colonies, the Virginians moved the capital to the more defensible city of Richmond, and Monroe accompanied Jefferson to the new capital. As governor of Virginia, Jefferson held command over its militia, and made Monroe a colonel. Monroe established a messenger network to coordinate with the Continental Army and other state militias. Still unable to raise an army due to a lack of interested recruits, Monroe traveled to his home in King George County, and thus was not present for the British raid of Richmond. As both the Continental Army and the Virginia militia had an abundance of officers, Monroe did not serve during the Yorktown campaign, and, much to his frustration, did not take part in the Siege of Yorktown. Although Andrew Jackson served as a courier in a militia unit at age 13, Monroe is regarded as the last U.S. president who was a Revolutionary War veteran, since he served as an officer of the Continental Army and took part in combat. As a result of his service, Monroe became a member of the Society of the Cincinnati.

Monroe resumed studying law under Jefferson and continued until 1783. He was not particularly interested in legal theory or practice, but chose to take it up because he thought it offered "the most immediate rewards" and could ease his path to wealth, social standing, and political influence. Monroe was admitted to the Virginia bar and practiced in Fredericksburg, Virginia.

Marriage and family

On February 16, 1786, Monroe married Elizabeth Kortright (1768–1830) in New York City. She was the daughter of Hannah Aspinwall Kortright and Laurence Kortright, a wealthy trader and former British officer. Monroe met her while serving in the Continental Congress.

After a brief honeymoon on Long Island, New York, the Monroes returned to New York City to live with her father until Congress adjourned. They then moved to Virginia, settling in Charlottesville, Virginia, in 1789. They bought an estate in Charlottesville known as Ash Lawn–Highland, settling on the property in 1799. The Monroes had three children.
 Eliza Monroe Hay was born in Fredericksburg, Virginia, in 1786, and was educated in Paris at the school of Madame Campan during the time her father was the United States Ambassador to France. In 1808 she married George Hay, a prominent Virginia attorney who had served as prosecutor in the trial of Aaron Burr and later as a U.S. District Judge. She died in 1840.
 James Spence Monroe was born in 1799 and died sixteen months later in 1800.
 Maria Hester Monroe (1802–1850) married her cousin Samuel L. Gouverneur on March 8, 1820, in the White House, the first president's child to marry there.

Plantations and slavery

Monroe sold his small Virginia plantation in 1783 to enter law and politics. Although he owned multiple properties over the course of his lifetime, his plantations were never profitable. Although he owned much more land and many more slaves, and speculated in property, he was rarely on site to oversee the operations. Overseers treated the slaves harshly to force production, but the plantations barely broke even. Monroe incurred debts by his lavish and expensive lifestyle and often sold property (including slaves) to pay them off. The labor of Monroe's many slaves were also used to support his daughter and son-in-law, along with a ne'er-do-well brother and his son.

During the course of his presidency, Monroe remained convinced that slavery was wrong and supported private manumission, but at the same time he insisted that any attempt to promote emancipation would cause more problems. Monroe believed that slavery had become a permanent part of southern life, and that it could only be removed on providential terms. Like so many other Upper South slaveholders, Monroe believed that a central purpose of government was to ensure "domestic tranquility" for all. Like so many other Upper South planters, he also believed that the central purpose of government was to empower planters like himself. He feared for public safety in the United States during the era of violent revolution on two fronts. First, from potential class warfare of the French Revolution in which those of the propertied classes were summarily purged in mob violence and then preemptive trials, and second, from possible racial warfare similar to that of the Haitian Revolution in which blacks, whites, then mixed-race inhabitants were indiscriminately slaughtered as events there unfolded.

Early political career

Virginia politics
Monroe was elected to the Virginia House of Delegates in 1782. After serving on Virginia's Executive Council, he was elected to the Congress of the Confederation in November 1783 and served in Annapolis until Congress convened in Trenton, New Jersey in June 1784. He had served a total of three years when he finally retired from that office by the rule of rotation. By that time, the government was meeting in the temporary capital of New York City. In 1784, Monroe undertook an extensive trip through Western New York and Pennsylvania to inspect the conditions in the Northwest. The tour convinced him that the United States had to pressure Britain to abandon its posts in the region and assert control of the Northwest. While serving in Congress, Monroe became an advocate for western expansion, and played a key role in the writing and passage of the Northwest Ordinance. The ordinance created the Northwest Territory, providing for federal administration of the territories West of Pennsylvania and North of the Ohio River. During this period, Jefferson continued to serve as a mentor to Monroe, and, at Jefferson's prompting, he befriended another prominent Virginian, James Madison.

Monroe resigned from Congress in 1786 to focus on his legal career, and he became an attorney for the state. In 1787, Monroe won election to another term in the Virginia House of Delegates. Though he had become outspoken in his desire to reform the Articles, he was unable to attend the Philadelphia Convention due to his work obligations. In 1788, Monroe became a delegate to the Virginia Ratifying Convention. In Virginia, the struggle over the ratification of the proposed Constitution involved more than a simple clash between federalists and anti-federalists. Virginians held a full spectrum of opinions about the merits of the proposed change in national government. Washington and Madison were leading supporters; Patrick Henry and George Mason were leading opponents. Those who held the middle ground in the ideological struggle became the central figures. Led by Monroe and Edmund Pendleton, these "federalists who are for amendments" criticized the absence of a bill of rights and worried about surrendering taxation powers to the central government. After Madison reversed himself and promised to pass a bill of rights, the Virginia convention ratified the constitution by a narrow vote, though Monroe himself voted against it. Virginia was the tenth state to ratify the Constitution, and all thirteen states eventually ratified the document.

Senator

Henry and other anti-federalists hoped to elect a Congress that would amend the Constitution to take away most of the powers it had been granted ("commit suicide on [its] own authority", as Madison put it). Henry recruited Monroe to run against Madison for a House seat in the First Congress, and he had the Virginia legislature draw a congressional district designed to elect Monroe. During the campaign, Madison and Monroe often traveled together, and the election did not destroy their friendship. In the election for Virginia's Fifth District, Madison prevailed over Monroe, taking 1,308 votes compared to Monroe's 972 votes. Following his defeat, Monroe returned to his legal duties and developed his farm in Charlottesville. After the death of Senator William Grayson in 1790, Virginia legislators elected Monroe to serve the remainder of Grayson's term.

During the presidency of George Washington, U.S. politics became increasingly polarized between the supporters of Secretary of State Jefferson and
the Federalists, led by Secretary of the Treasury Alexander Hamilton. Monroe stood firmly with Jefferson in opposing Hamilton's strong central government and strong executive. The Democratic-Republican Party coalesced around Jefferson and Madison, and Monroe became one of the fledgling party's leaders in the Senate. He also helped organize opposition to John Adams in the 1792
election, though Adams defeated George Clinton to win re-election as vice president. As the 1790s progressed, the French Revolutionary Wars came to dominate U.S. foreign policy, with British and French raids both threatening U.S. trade with Europe. Like most other Jeffersonians, Monroe supported the French Revolution, but Hamilton's followers tended to sympathize more with Britain. In 1794, hoping to find a way to avoid war with both countries, Washington appointed Monroe as his minister (ambassador) to France. At the same time, he appointed the anglophile Federalist John Jay as his minister to Britain.

Minister to France

After arriving in France, Monroe addressed the National Convention, receiving a standing ovation for his speech celebrating republicanism. He experienced several early diplomatic successes, including the protection of U.S. trade from French attacks. He also used his influence to win the release of Thomas Paine and Adrienne de La Fayette, the wife of the Marquis de Lafayette. Months after Monroe arrived in France, the U.S. and Great Britain concluded the Jay Treaty, outraging both the French and Monroe—not fully informed about the treaty prior to its publication. Despite the undesirable effects of the Jay Treaty on Franco-American relations, Monroe won French support for U.S. navigational rights on the Mississippi River—the mouth of which was controlled by Spain—and in 1795 the U.S. and Spain signed Pinckney's Treaty. The treaty granted the U.S. limited rights to use the port of New Orleans.

Washington decided Monroe was inefficient, disruptive, and failed to safeguard the national interest.  He recalled Monroe in November 1796.  Returning to his home in Charlottesville, he resumed his dual careers as a farmer and lawyer. Jefferson and Madison urged Monroe to run for Congress, but Monroe chose to focus on state politics instead. John Skey Eustace was the author of several pamphlets, some designed to embarrass James Monroe: 

In 1798 Monroe published  A View of the Conduct of the Executive, in the Foreign Affairs of the United States: Connected with the Mission to the French Republic, During the Years 1794, 5, and 6 . It was a long defense of his term as Minister to France. He followed the advice of his friend Robert Livingston who cautioned him to "repress every harsh and acrimonious" comment about Washington. However, he did complain that too often the U.S. government had been too close to Britain, especially regarding the Jay Treaty.  Washington made notes on this copy, writing, "The truth is, Mr. Monroe was cajoled, flattered, and made to believe strange things. In return he did, or was disposed to do, whatever was pleasing to that nation, reluctantly urging the rights of his own."

Confrontations and strife with Alexander Hamilton
In November 1792, James Reynolds and Jacob Clingman were arrested for counterfeiting and speculating in Revolutionary War veterans' unpaid back wages. Then-Senator Monroe and congressmen Frederick Muhlenberg and Abraham Venable investigated the charges.  They found that Alexander Hamilton had been making payments to James Reynolds, and suspected Hamilton was involved in the crimes. They asked him about it, and Hamilton denied involvement in the financial crimes, but admitted that he'd made payments to Reynolds, and explained he'd had an affair with Reynolds' wife, Maria.  James Reynolds had found out and was blackmailing him.  He offered letters to prove his story.  The investigators immediately dropped the matter, and Monroe promised Hamilton he would keep the matter private.

Jacob Clingman told Maria about the claim she'd had an affair with Hamilton, and she denied it, claiming the letters had been forged to help cover up the corruption. Clingman went to Monroe about this. Monroe added that interview to his notes, and sent the entire set to a friend, possibly Thomas Jefferson, for safekeeping. Unfortunately, the secretary who was involved in managing the notes of the investigation made copies and gave them to scandal writer James Callender.

Five years later, shortly after Monroe was recalled from France, Callender published accusations against Hamilton based on those notes. Hamilton and his wife thought this was retaliation on the part of Monroe for the recall, and confronted him via letter. In a subsequent meeting between the two of them, where Hamilton had suggested each bring a "second", Hamilton accused Monroe of lying, and challenged him to a duel. While such challenges were usually hot air, in this case Monroe replied "I am ready, get your pistols." Their seconds interceded, and an arrangement was made to give Hamilton documentation on what had occurred with the investigation.

Hamilton was not satisfied with the subsequent explanations, and at the end of an exchange of letters the two were threatening duels, again. Monroe chose Aaron Burr as his second. Burr worked as a negotiator between the two parties, believing they were both being "childish", and eventually helped settle matters.

Governor of Virginia and diplomat (1799–1802, 1811)

Governor of Virginia
On a party-line vote, the Virginia legislature elected Monroe as Governor of Virginia in 1799. He would serve as governor until 1802. The constitution of Virginia endowed the governor with very few powers aside from commanding the militia when the Assembly called it into action. But Monroe used his stature to convince legislators to enhance state involvement in transportation and education and to increase training for the militia. Monroe also began to give State of the Commonwealth addresses to the legislature, in which he highlighted areas in which he believed the legislature should act. Monroe also led an effort to create the state's first penitentiary, and imprisonment replaced other, often harsher, punishments. In 1800, Monroe called out the state militia to suppress Gabriel's Rebellion, a slave rebellion originating on a plantation six miles from the capital of Richmond. Gabriel and 27 other enslaved people who participated were all hanged for treason. As Governor, Monroe secretly worked with President Thomas Jefferson to secure a location where free and enslaved African Americans suspected of "conspiracy, insurgency, Treason, and rebellion" would be permanently banished.

Monroe thought that foreign and Federalist elements had created the Quasi War of 1798–1800, and he strongly supported Thomas Jefferson's candidacy for president in 1800. Federalists were likewise suspicious of Monroe, some viewing him at best as a French dupe and at worst a traitor. With the power to appoint election officials in Virginia, Monroe exercised his influence to help Jefferson win Virginia's presidential electors. He also considered using the Virginia militia to force the outcome in favor of Jefferson. Jefferson won the 1800 election, and he appointed Madison as his Secretary of State. As a member of Jefferson's party and the leader of the largest state in the country, Monroe emerged as one of Jefferson's two most likely successors, alongside Madison.

Louisiana Purchase and Minister to Great Britain
Shortly after the end of Monroe's gubernatorial tenure, President Jefferson sent Monroe back to France to assist Ambassador Robert R. Livingston in negotiating the Louisiana Purchase. In the 1800 Treaty of San Ildefonso, France had acquired the territory of Louisiana from Spain; at the time, many in the U.S. believed that France had also acquired West Florida in the same treaty. The American delegation originally sought to acquire West Florida and the city of New Orleans, which controlled the trade of the Mississippi River. Determined to acquire New Orleans even if it meant war with France, Jefferson also authorized Monroe to form an alliance with the British if the French refused to sell the city.

Meeting with François Barbé-Marbois, the French foreign minister, Monroe and Livingston agreed to purchase the entire territory of Louisiana for $15 million; the purchase became known as the Louisiana Purchase. In agreeing to the purchase, Monroe violated his instructions, which had only allowed $9 million for the purchase of New Orleans and West Florida. The French did not acknowledge that West Florida remained in Spanish possession, and the United States would claim that France had sold West Florida to the United States for several years to come. Though he had not ordered the purchase of the entire territory, Jefferson strongly supported Monroe's actions, which ensured that the United States would continue to expand to the West. Overcoming doubts about whether the Constitution authorized the purchase of foreign territory, Jefferson won congressional approval for the Louisiana Purchase, and the acquisition doubled the size of the United States. Monroe would travel to Spain in 1805 to try to win the cession of West Florida, but, with the support of France, Spain refused to consider relinquishing the territory.

After the resignation of Rufus King, Monroe was appointed as the ambassador to Great Britain in 1803. The greatest issue of contention between the United States and Britain was that of the impressment of U.S. sailors. Many U.S. merchant ships employed British seamen who had deserted or dodged conscription, and the British frequently impressed sailors on U.S. ships in hopes of quelling their manpower issues. Many of the sailors they impressed had never been British subjects, and Monroe was tasked with persuading the British to stop their practice of impressment. Monroe found little success in this endeavor, partly due to Jefferson's alienation of the British minister to the United States, Anthony Merry. Rejecting Jefferson's offer to serve as the first governor of Louisiana Territory, Monroe continued to serve as ambassador to Britain until 1807.

In 1806 he negotiated the Monroe–Pinkney Treaty with Great Britain. It would have extended the Jay Treaty of 1794 which had expired after ten years. Jefferson had fought the Jay Treaty intensely in 1794–95 because he felt it would allow the British to subvert American republicanism. The treaty had produced ten years of peace and highly lucrative trade for American merchants, but Jefferson was still opposed. When Monroe and the British signed the new treaty in December 1806, Jefferson refused to submit it to the Senate for ratification. Although the treaty called for ten more years of trade between the United States and the British Empire and gave American merchants guarantees that would have been good for business, Jefferson was unhappy that it did not end the hated British practice of impressment, and refused to give up the potential weapon of commercial warfare against Britain. The president made no attempt to obtain another treaty, and as a result, the two nations drifted from peace toward the War of 1812. Monroe was severely pained by the administration's repudiation of the treaty, and he fell out with Secretary of State James Madison.

1808 election and the Quids
On his return to Virginia in 1807, Monroe received a warm reception, and many urged him to run in the 1808 presidential election. After Jefferson refused to submit the Monroe-Pinkney Treaty, Monroe had come to believe that Jefferson had snubbed the treaty out of the desire to avoid elevating Monroe above Madison in 1808. Out of deference to Jefferson, Monroe agreed to avoid actively campaigning for the presidency, but he did not rule out accepting a draft effort. The Democratic-Republican Party was increasingly factionalized, with "Old Republicans" or "Quids" denouncing the Jefferson administration for abandoning what they considered to be true republican principles. The Quids tried to enlist Monroe in their cause. The plan was to run Monroe for president in the 1808 election in cooperation with the Federalist Party, which had a strong base in New England. John Randolph of Roanoke led the Quid effort to stop Jefferson's choice of Madison. The regular Democratic-Republicans overcame the Quids in the nominating caucus, kept control of the party in Virginia, and protected Madison's base. Monroe did not publicly criticize Jefferson or Madison during Madison's campaign against Federalist Charles Cotesworth Pinckney, but he refused to support Madison. Madison defeated Pinckney by a large margin, carrying all but one state outside of New England. Monroe won 3,400 votes in Virginia, but received little support elsewhere. After the election Monroe quickly reconciled with Jefferson, but their friendship endured further strains when Jefferson did not promote Monroe's candidacy to Congress in 1809. Monroe did not speak with Madison until 1810. Returning to private life, he devoted his attentions to farming at his Charlottesville estate.

Secretary of State and Secretary of War (1811–1817)

Madison administration

Monroe returned to the Virginia House of Burgesses and was elected to another term as governor in 1811, but served only four months. In April 1811, Madison appointed Monroe as Secretary of State in hopes of shoring up the support of the more radical factions of the Democratic-Republicans. Madison also hoped that Monroe, an experienced diplomat with whom he had once been close friends, would improve upon the performance of the previous Secretary of State, Robert Smith. Madison assured Monroe that their differences regarding the Monroe-Pinkney Treaty had been a misunderstanding, and the two resumed their friendship. The Senate voted unanimously (30–0) to confirm him. On taking office, Monroe hoped to negotiate treaties with the British and French to end the attacks on American merchant ships. While the French agreed to reduce the attacks and release seized American ships, the British were less receptive to Monroe's demands. Monroe had long worked for peace with the British, but he came to favor war with Britain, joining with "war hawks" such as Speaker of the House Henry Clay. With the support of Monroe and Clay, Madison asked Congress to declare war upon the British, and Congress complied on June 18, 1812, thus beginning the War of 1812.

The war went very badly, and the Madison administration quickly sought peace, but were rejected by the British. The U.S. Navy did experience several successes after Monroe convinced Madison to allow the Navy's ships to set sail rather than remaining in port for the duration of the war. After the resignation of Secretary of War William Eustis, Madison asked Monroe to serve in dual roles as Secretary of State and Secretary of War, but opposition from the Senate limited Monroe to serving as acting Secretary of War until Brigadier General John Armstrong won Senate confirmation. Monroe and Armstrong clashed over war policy, and Armstrong blocked Monroe's hopes of being appointed to lead an invasion of Canada. As the war dragged on, the British offered to begin negotiations in Ghent, and the United States sent a delegation led by John Quincy Adams to conduct negotiations. Monroe allowed Adams leeway in setting terms, so long as he ended the hostilities and preserved American neutrality.

When the British burned the U.S. Capitol and the White House on August 24, 1814, Madison removed Armstrong as Secretary of War and turned to Monroe for help, appointing him Secretary of War on September 27. Monroe resigned as Secretary of State on October 1, 1814, but no successor was ever appointed and thus from October 1814 to February 28, 1815, Monroe effectively held both Cabinet posts. Now in command of the war effort, Monroe ordered General Andrew Jackson to defend against a likely attack on New Orleans by the British, and he asked the governors of nearby states to send their militias to reinforce Jackson. He also called on Congress to draft an army of 100,000 men, increase compensation to soldiers, and establish a new national bank to ensure adequate funding for the war effort. Months after Monroe took office as Secretary of War, the war ended with the signing of the Treaty of Ghent. The treaty resulted in a return to the status quo ante bellum, and many outstanding issues between the United States and Britain remained. But Americans celebrated the end of the war as a great victory, partly due to the news of the treaty reaching the United States shortly after Jackson's victory in the Battle of New Orleans. With the end of the Napoleonic Wars in 1815, the British also ended the practice of impressment. After the war, Congress authorized the creation of a national bank in the form of the Second Bank of the United States.

Election of 1816

Monroe decided to seek the presidency in the 1816 election, and his war-time leadership had established him as Madison's heir apparent. Monroe had strong support from many in the party, but his candidacy was challenged at the 1816 Democratic-Republican congressional nominating caucus. Secretary of the Treasury William H. Crawford had the support of numerous Southern and Western Congressmen, while Governor Daniel D. Tompkins was backed by several Congressmen from New York. Crawford appealed especially to many Democratic-Republicans who were wary of Madison and Monroe's support for the establishment of the Second Bank of the United States. Despite his substantial backing, Crawford decided to defer to Monroe on the belief that he could eventually run as Monroe's successor, and Monroe won his party's nomination. Tompkins won the party's vice presidential nomination. The moribund Federalists nominated Rufus King as their presidential nominee, but the party offered little opposition following the conclusion of a popular war that they had opposed. Monroe received 183 of the 217 electoral votes, winning every state but Massachusetts, Connecticut, and Delaware. Since he previously served as an officer of the Continental Army during the Revolutionary War and as a delegate in the Continental Congress, he became the last president who was a Founding Father.

Presidency (1817–1825)

Domestic affairs

Democratic-Republican Party dominance

Monroe largely ignored old party lines in making federal appointments, which reduced political tensions and augmented the sense of "oneness" that pervaded the United States. He made two long national tours to build national trust. At Boston, a newspaper hailed his 1817 visit as the beginning of an "Era of Good Feelings". Frequent stops on his tours included ceremonies of welcome and expressions of good-will. The Federalist Party continued to fade during his administration; it maintained its vitality and organizational integrity in Delaware and a few localities, but lacked influence in national politics. Lacking serious opposition, the Democratic-Republican Party's Congressional caucus stopped meeting, and for practical purposes the party stopped operating.

Administration and cabinet

Monroe appointed a geographically balanced cabinet, through which he led the executive branch. At Monroe's request, Crawford continued to serve as Treasury Secretary. Monroe also chose to retain Benjamin Crowninshield of Massachusetts as Secretary of the Navy and Richard Rush of Pennsylvania as Attorney General. Recognizing Northern discontent at the continuation of the Virginia dynasty, Monroe chose John Quincy Adams of Massachusetts as Secretary of State, making Adams the early favorite to eventually succeed Monroe. An experienced diplomat, Adams had abandoned the Federalist Party in 1807 in support of Thomas Jefferson's foreign policy, and Monroe hoped that the appointment would encourage the defection of more Federalists. After General Andrew Jackson declined appointment as Secretary of War, Monroe turned to South Carolina Congressman John C. Calhoun, leaving the Cabinet without a prominent Westerner. In late 1817 Rush became the ambassador to Britain, and William Wirt succeeded him as Attorney General. With the exception of Crowninshield, the rest of Monroe's initial cabinet appointees remained in place for the remainder of his presidency.

Missouri Compromise

In February 1819, a bill to enable the people of the Missouri Territory to draft a constitution and form a government preliminary to admission into the Union came before the House of Representatives. During these proceedings, Congressman James Tallmadge, Jr. of New York "tossed a bombshell into the Era of Good Feelings" by offering the Tallmadge Amendment, which prohibited the further introduction of slaves into Missouri and required that all future children of slave parents therein should be free at the age of twenty-five years. After three days of rancorous and sometimes bitter debate, the bill, with Tallmadge's amendments, passed. The measure then went to the Senate, which rejected both amendments. A House–Senate conference committee proved unable to resolve the disagreements on the bill, and so the entire measure failed. The ensuing debates pitted the northern "restrictionists" (antislavery legislators who wished to bar slavery from the Louisiana territories and prohibit slavery's further expansion) against southern "anti-restrictionists" (proslavery legislators who rejected any interference by Congress inhibiting slavery expansion).

During the following session, the House passed a similar bill with an amendment, introduced on January 26, 1820, by John W. Taylor of New York, allowing Missouri into the union as a slave state. Initially, Monroe opposed any compromise that involved restrictions on slavery's expansion in federal territories. The question had been complicated by the admission in December of Alabama, a slave state, making the number of slave and free states equal. In addition, there was a bill in passage through the House (January 3, 1820) to admit Maine as a free state. Southern congressmen sought to force northerners to accept slavery in Missouri by connecting Maine and Missouri statehood. In this plan, endorsed by Monroe, Maine statehood would be held hostage to slavery in Missouri. In February 1820 the Senate passed a bill for the admission of Maine with an amendment enabling the people of Missouri to form a state constitution. Before the bill was returned to the House, a second amendment was adopted on the motion of Jesse B. Thomas of Illinois, excluding slavery from the Louisiana Territory north of the parallel 36°30′ north (the southern boundary of Missouri), except within the limits of the proposed state of Missouri. The House then approved the bill as amended by the Senate.
The legislation passed, and became known as "the Missouri Compromise". Though Monroe remained firmly opposed to any compromise that restricted slavery anywhere, he reluctantly signed the Compromise into law (March 6, 1820) only because he believed it was the least bad alternative for southern slaveholders. The Missouri Compromise temporarily settled the issue of slavery in the territories.

Internal improvements

As the United States continued to grow, many Americans advocated a system of internal improvements to help the country develop. Federal assistance for such projects evolved slowly and haphazardly—the product of contentious congressional factions and an executive branch generally concerned with avoiding unconstitutional federal intrusions into state affairs. Monroe believed that the young nation needed an improved infrastructure, including a transportation network to grow and thrive economically, but did not think that the Constitution authorized Congress to build, maintain, and operate a national transportation system. Monroe repeatedly urged Congress to pass an amendment allowing Congress the power to finance internal improvements, but Congress never acted on his proposal, in part because many congressmen believed that the Constitution did in fact authorize the federal financing of internal improvements. In 1822, Congress passed a bill authorizing the collection of tolls on the Cumberland Road, with the tolls being used to finance repairs on the road. Adhering to stated position regarding internal improvements, Monroe vetoed the bill. In an elaborate essay, Monroe set forth his constitutional views on the subject. Congress might appropriate money, he admitted, but it might not undertake the actual construction of national works nor assume jurisdiction over them.

In 1824, the Supreme Court ruled in Gibbons v. Ogden that the Constitution's Commerce Clause gave the federal government the authority to regulate interstate commerce. Shortly thereafter, Congress passed two important laws that, together, marked the beginning of the federal government's continuous involvement in civil works. The General Survey Act authorized the president to have surveys made of routes for roads and canals "of national importance, in a commercial or military point of view, or necessary for the transportation of public mail". The president assigned responsibility for the surveys to the Army Corps of Engineers. The second act, passed a month later, appropriated $75,000 to improve navigation on the Ohio and Mississippi rivers by removing sandbars, snags, and other obstacles. Subsequently, the act was amended to include other rivers such as the Missouri. This work, too, was given to the Corps of Engineers—the only formally trained body of engineers in the new republic and, as part of the nation's small army, available to serve the wishes of Congress and the executive branch.

Panic of 1819

Two years into his presidency, Monroe faced an economic crisis known as the Panic of 1819, the first major depression to hit the country since the ratification of the Constitution in 1788. The panic stemmed from declining imports and exports, and sagging agricultural prices as global markets readjusted to peacetime production and commerce in the aftermath of the War of 1812 and the Napoleonic Wars. The severity of the economic downturn in the U.S. was compounded by excessive speculation in public lands, fueled by the unrestrained issue of paper money from banks and business concerns. Monroe lacked the power to intervene directly in the economy, as banks were largely regulated by the states, and he could do little to stem the economic crisis.

Before the onset of the Panic of 1819, some business leaders had called on Congress to increase tariff rates to address the negative balance of trade and help struggling industries. As the panic spread, Monroe declined to call a special session of Congress to address the economy. When Congress finally reconvened in December 1819, Monroe requested an increase in the tariff but declined to recommend specific rates. Congress would not raise tariff rates until the passage of the Tariff of 1824. The panic resulted in high unemployment and an increase in bankruptcies and foreclosures, and provoked popular resentment against banking and business enterprises.

Foreign affairs
According to historian William Earl Weeks, "Monroe evolved a comprehensive strategy aimed at expanding the Union externally while solidifying it internally". He expanded trade and pacified relations with Great Britain while expanding the United States at the expense of the Spanish Empire, from which he obtained Florida and the recognition of a border across the continent. Faced with the breakdown of the expansionist consensus over the question of slavery, the president tried to provide both North and South with guarantees that future expansion would not tip the balance of power between slave and free states, a system that, Weeks remarks, did indeed allow the continuation of American expansion for the best of four decades.

Treaties with Britain and Russia

Monroe pursued warmer relations with Britain in the aftermath of the War of 1812. In 1817, the United States and Britain signed the Rush–Bagot Treaty, which regulated naval armaments on the Great Lakes and Lake Champlain and demilitarized the border between the U.S. and British North America. The Treaty of 1818, also with Great Britain, was concluded October 20, 1818, and fixed the present Canada–United States border from Minnesota to the Rocky Mountains at the 49th parallel. The accords also established a joint U.S.–British occupation of Oregon Country for the next ten years. Though they did not solve every outstanding issue between the U.S. and Britain, the treaties allowed for greater trade between the United States and the British Empire and helped avoid an expensive naval arms race in the Great Lakes. Late in Monroe's second term, the U.S. concluded the Russo-American Treaty of 1824 with the Russian Empire, setting the southern limit of Russian sovereignty on the Pacific coast of North America at the 54°40′ parallel (the present southern tip of the Alaska Panhandle).

Acquisition of Florida

Spain had long rejected repeated American efforts to purchase Florida. But by 1818, Spain was facing a troubling colonial situation in which the cession of Florida made sense. Spain had been exhausted by the Peninsular War in Europe and needed to rebuild its credibility and presence in its colonies. Revolutionaries in Central America and South America were beginning to demand independence. Spain was unwilling to invest further in Florida, encroached on by American settlers, and it worried about the border between New Spain and the United States. With only a minor military presence in Florida, Spain was not able to restrain the Seminole warriors who routinely crossed the border and raided American villages and farms, as well as protected southern slave refugees from slave owners and traders of the southern United States. The Seminole people were also providing sanctuary for runaway slaves, those of which the United States wanted back.

In response to Seminole attacks and their provision of aid to escaped slaves, Monroe ordered a military expedition to cross into Spanish Florida and attack the Seminoles. In this expedition, led by Andrew Jackson, the US Army displaced numerous Seminole people from their houses along with burning their towns. Jackson also seized the Spanish territorial capital of Pensacola. With the capture of Pensacola, Jackson established de facto American control of the entire territory. While Monroe supported Jackson's actions, many in Congress harshly criticized what they saw as an undeclared war. With the support of Secretary of State Adams, Monroe defended Jackson against domestic and international criticism, and the United States began negotiations with Spain.

Spain faced revolt in all of its American colonies and could neither govern nor defend Florida. On February 22, 1819, Spain and the United States signed the Adams–Onís Treaty, which ceded the Floridas in return for the assumption by the United States of claims of American citizens against Spain to an amount not exceeding $5,000,000. The treaty also contained a definition of the boundary between Spanish and American possessions on the North American continent. Beginning at the mouth of the Sabine River the line ran along that river to the 32nd parallel, then due north to the Red River, which it followed to the 100th meridian, due north to the Arkansas River, and along that river to its source, then north to the 42nd parallel, which it followed to the Pacific Ocean. As the United States renounced all claims to the west and south of this boundary (Texas, New Mexico, Arizona, California, Colorado, Utah, Nevada), so Spain surrendered any title she had to the Northwest (Oregon Country).

Monroe Doctrine

Monroe was deeply sympathetic to the Latin American revolutionary movements against Spain. He was determined that the United States should never repeat the policies of the Washington administration during the French Revolution, when the nation had failed to demonstrate its sympathy for the aspirations of peoples seeking to establish republican governments. He did not envisage military involvement in Latin American affairs, but only the provision of moral support, as he believed that a direct American intervention would provoke other European powers into assisting Spain. Monroe initially refused to recognize the Latin American governments due to ongoing negotiations with Spain over Florida.

In March 1822, Monroe officially recognized the countries of Argentina, Peru, Colombia, Chile, and Mexico, all of which had won independence from Spain. Secretary of State Adams, under Monroe's supervision, wrote the instructions for the ministers to these new countries. They declared that the policy of the United States was to uphold republican institutions and to seek treaties of commerce on a most-favored-nation basis. The United States would support inter-American congresses dedicated to the development of economic and political institutions fundamentally differing from those prevailing in Europe. Monroe took pride as the United States was the first nation to extend recognition and to set an example to the rest of the world for its support of the "cause of liberty and humanity".

For their part, the British also had a strong interest in ensuring the demise of Spanish colonialism, with all the trade restrictions mercantilism imposed. In October 1823, Richard Rush, the American minister in London, advised that Foreign Secretary George Canning was proposing that the U.S. and Britain issue a joint declaration to deter any other power from intervening in Central and South America. Adams vigorously opposed cooperation with Great Britain, contending that a statement of bilateral nature could limit United States expansion in the future. He also argued that the British were not committed to recognizing the Latin American republics and must have had imperial motivations themselves.

Two months later, the bilateral statement proposed by the British became a unilateral declaration by the United States. While Monroe thought that Spain was unlikely to re-establish its colonial empire on its own, he feared that France or the Holy Alliance might seek to establish control over the former Spanish possessions. On December 2, 1823, in his annual message to Congress, Monroe articulated what became known as the Monroe Doctrine. He first reiterated the traditional U.S. policy of neutrality with regard to European wars and conflicts. He then declared that the United States would not accept the recolonization of any country by its former European master, though he also avowed non-interference with existing European colonies in the Americas. Finally, he stated that European countries should no longer consider the Western Hemisphere open to new colonization, a jab aimed primarily at Russia, which was attempting to expand its colony on the northern Pacific Coast.

Election of 1820

The collapse of the Federalists left Monroe with no organized opposition at the end of his first term, and he ran for reelection unopposed, the only president other than Washington to do so. A single elector from New Hampshire, William Plumer, cast a vote for John Quincy Adams, preventing a unanimous vote in the Electoral College. He did so because he thought Monroe was incompetent. Later in the century, the story arose that he had cast his dissenting vote so that only George Washington would have the honor of unanimous election. Plumer never mentioned Washington in his speech explaining his vote to the other New Hampshire electors.

States admitted to the Union
Five new states were admitted to the Union while Monroe was in office:
 MississippiDecember 10, 1817
 IllinoisDecember 3, 1818
 AlabamaDecember 14, 1819
 MaineMarch 15, 1820
 MissouriAugust 10, 1821

Post-presidency (1825–1831)

When his presidency ended on March 4, 1825, James Monroe resided at Monroe Hill, what is now included in the grounds of the University of Virginia. He served on the university's Board of Visitors under Jefferson and under the second rector James Madison, both former presidents, almost until his death. He and his wife lived at Oak Hill in Aldie, Virginia, until Elizabeth's death at age 62 on September 23, 1830. In August 1825, the Monroes had received Marquis de Lafayette and President John Quincy Adams as guests there.

Monroe incurred many unliquidated debts during his years of public life. He sold off his Highland Plantation. It is now owned by his alma mater, the College of William and Mary, which has opened it to the public as a historic site. Throughout his life, he was financially insolvent, which was exacerbated by his wife's poor health.

Monroe was elected as a delegate to the Virginia Constitutional Convention of 1829-1830. He was one of four delegates elected from the senatorial district made up of his home district of Loudoun and Fairfax County. In October 1829, he was elected by the convention to serve as the presiding officer, until his failing health required him to withdraw on December 8, after which Philip P. Barbour of Orange County was elected presiding officer.

Upon Elizabeth's death in 1830, Monroe moved to 63 Prince Street at Lafayette Place in New York City to live with his daughter Maria Hester Monroe Gouverneur, who had married Samuel L. Gouverneur. Monroe's health began to slowly fail by the end of the 1820s. On July 4, 1831, Monroe died at age 73 from heart failure and tuberculosis, thus becoming the third president to have died on Independence Day. His death came 55 years after the United States Declaration of Independence was proclaimed and five years after the deaths of John Adams and Thomas Jefferson. Monroe was originally buried in New York at the Gouverneur family's vault in the New York City Marble Cemetery. 27 years later, in 1858, his body was re-interred at the President's Circle in Hollywood Cemetery in Richmond, Virginia. The James Monroe Tomb is a U.S. National Historic Landmark.

Religious beliefs
"When it comes to Monroe's thoughts on religion," historian Bliss Isely notes, "less is known than that of any other President." No letters survive in which he discussed his religious beliefs. Nor did his friends, family or associates comment on his beliefs. Letters that do survive, such as ones written after the death of his son, contain no discussion of religion.

Monroe was raised in a family that belonged to the Church of England when it was the state church in Virginia before the Revolution. As an adult, he attended Episcopal churches. Some historians see "deistic tendencies" in his few references to an impersonal God. Unlike Jefferson, Monroe was rarely attacked as an atheist or infidel. In 1832 James Renwick Willson, a Reformed Presbyterian minister in Albany, New York, criticized Monroe for having "lived and died like a second-rate Athenian philosopher".

Slavery
Monroe owned dozens of slaves. He took several slaves with him to Washington to serve at the White House from 1817 to 1825. This was typical of other slaveholding presidents.

As president of Virginia's constitutional convention in the fall of 1829, Monroe reiterated his belief that slavery was a blight which, even as a British colony, Virginia had attempted to eradicate. "What was the origin of our slave population?" he rhetorically asked. "The evil commenced when we were in our Colonial state, but acts were passed by our Colonial Legislature, prohibiting the importation, of more slaves, into the Colony. These were rejected by the Crown." To the dismay of states' rights proponents, he was willing to accept the federal government's financial assistance to emancipate and transport freed slaves to other countries. At the convention, Monroe made his final public statement on slavery, proposing that Virginia emancipate and deport its bondsmen with "the aid of the Union".

When Monroe was Governor of Virginia in 1800, hundreds of slaves from Virginia planned to kidnap him, take Richmond, and negotiate for their freedom. Gabriel's slave conspiracy was discovered. Monroe called out the militia; the slave patrols soon captured some slaves accused of involvement. Sidbury says some trials had a few measures to prevent abuses, such as an appointed attorney, but they were "hardly 'fair'". Slave codes prevented slaves from being treated like whites, and they were given quick trials without a jury. Monroe influenced the Executive Council to pardon and sell some slaves instead of hanging them. Historians say the Virginia courts executed between 26 and 35 slaves. None of the executed slaves had killed any whites because the uprising had been foiled before it began. An additional 50 slaves charged for their role in the planned rebellion would be spared, as a result of pardons, acquittals, and commutations. One reason for this was influence of a letter Monroe received from Thomas Jefferson urging mercy, telling him "The other states & the world at large will for ever condemn us if we indulge a principle of revenge, or go one step beyond absolute necessity. They cannot lose sight of the rights of the two parties, & the object of the unsuccessful one." Only seven of the executions carried out against the rebels occurred after Monroe received Jefferson's letter.

Monroe was active in the American Colonization Society, which supported the establishment of colonies outside of the United States for free African Americans. The society helped send several thousand freed slaves to the new colony of Liberia in Africa from 1820 to 1840. Slave owners like Monroe and Andrew Jackson wanted to prevent free blacks from encouraging slaves in the South to rebel. Liberia's capital, Monrovia, was named after President Monroe.

Legacy

Historical reputation
Polls of historians and political scientists tend to rank Monroe as an above average president. Monroe presided over a period in which the United States began to turn away from European affairs and towards domestic issues. His presidency saw the United States settle many of its longstanding boundary issues through an accommodation with Britain and the acquisition of Florida. Monroe also helped resolve sectional tensions through his support of the Missouri Compromise and by seeking support from all regions of the country. Political scientist Fred Greenstein argues that Monroe was a more effective executive than some of his better-known predecessors, including Madison and John Adams.

Memorials

The capital of Liberia is named Monrovia after Monroe; it is the only national capital other than Washington, D.C. named after a U.S. president. Monroe is the namesake of seventeen Monroe counties. Monroe, Maine, Monroe, Michigan, Monroe, Georgia, Monroe, Connecticut, both Monroe Townships in New Jersey, and Fort Monroe are all named for him. Monroe has been depicted on U.S. currency and stamps, including a 1954 United States Postal Service 5¢ Liberty Issue postage stamp.

Monroe was the last U.S. president to wear a powdered wig tied in a queue, a tricorne hat and knee-breeches according to the style of the late 18th century. That earned him the nickname "The Last Cocked Hat". He was also the last president who was not photographed.

See also
 List of presidents of the United States
 List of presidents of the United States by previous experience
 List of United States political appointments that crossed party lines

Notes

References

Bibliography

Secondary sources

  706 pp. standard scholarly biography
 Ammon, Harry. "James Monroe" in Henry F. Graff ed., The Presidents: A Reference History (3rd ed. 2002) online
 Cresson, William P. James Monroe (1946). 577 pp. good scholarly biography
 . 246 pp. standard scholarly survey
 
 
  superficial, short, popular biography
 Haworth, Peter Daniel. "James Madison and James Monroe Historiography: A Tale of Two Divergent Bodies of Scholarship." in A Companion to James Madison and James Monroe (2013): 521–539.
  Pulitzer Prize; a sweeping interpretation of the era
 Holmes, David L. The Faiths of the Founding Fathers, May 2006, online version
 
 Leibiger, Stuart, ed. A Companion to James Madison and James Monroe (2012) excerpt; emphasis on historiography
 May, Ernest R. The Making of the Monroe Doctrine (1975).
 Perkins, Dexter. The Monroe Doctrine, 1823–1826 (1927).
 Poston, Brook. James Monroe: A Republican Champion. Gainesville, FL: University Press of Florida, 2019.
 
 Renehan Edward J., Jr. The Monroe Doctrine: The Cornerstone of American Foreign Policy (2007)
 Scherr, Arthur. "James Monroe and John Adams: An Unlikely 'Friendship'". The Historian 67#3 (2005) pp 405+. online edition
 Scherr, Arthur. "James Monroe on the Presidency and 'Foreign Influence: from the Virginia Ratifying Convention (1788) to Jefferson's Election (1801)." Mid-America 2002 84(1–3): 145–206. .
 Scherr, Arthur. "Governor James Monroe and the Southampton Slave Resistance of 1799." Historian 1999 61(3): 557–578.  Fulltext online in SwetsWise and Ebsco.
 , scholarly biography.
 
 
 Wood, Gordon S. Empire of Liberty: A history of the Early Republic, 1789–1815 (2009)

Primary sources
 Preston, Daniel, ed. The Papers of James Monroe: Selected Correspondence and Papers (6 vol, 2006 to 2017), the major scholarly edition; in progress, with coverage to 1814.
 Writings of James Monroe, edited by Stanislaus Murray Hamilton, ed., 7 vols. (1898–1903) online edition at Internet Archive

External links

 
 James Monroe: A Resource Guide at the Library of Congress
 American President: James Monroe (1758–1831) at the Miller Center of Public Affairs, University of Virginia
 James Monroe Papers  at the University of Mary Washington
 A Guide to the Papers of James Monroe 1778–1831 at the University of Virginia Library
 Monroe Doctrine; December 2, 1823 at the Avalon Project
 Elections for candidate James Monroe from "A New Nation Votes" at Tufts University
 Ash Lawn-Highland, home of President James Monroe
 The James Monroe Memorial Foundation
 The James Monroe Birthplace
 James Monroe Museum and Memorial Library
 "Life Portrait of James Monroe", from C-SPAN's American Presidents: Life Portraits, April 12, 1999
 
 
 
 James Monroe Personal Manuscripts

James Monroe
Founding Fathers of the United States
1758 births
1831 deaths
18th-century American Episcopalians
18th-century American politicians
18th-century American diplomats
19th-century American diplomats
19th-century American Episcopalians
19th-century American politicians
19th-century deaths from tuberculosis
19th-century presidents of the United States
Ambassadors of the United States to France
Ambassadors of the United States to the United Kingdom
American colonization movement
American Freemasons
American people of French descent
American people of Scottish descent
American people of the War of 1812
American people of Welsh descent
American planters
American slave owners
Anti-Federalists
Burials at Hollywood Cemetery (Richmond, Virginia)
Candidates in the 1808 United States presidential election
Candidates in the 1816 United States presidential election
Candidates in the 1820 United States presidential election
College of William & Mary alumni
Continental Army officers from Virginia
Continental Congressmen from Virginia
Delegates to the Virginia Ratifying Convention
Democratic-Republican Party presidents of the United States
Democratic-Republican Party state governors of the United States
Governors of Virginia
Hall of Fame for Great Americans inductees
1810s in the United States
1820s in the United States
Huguenot participants in the American Revolution
Tuberculosis deaths in New York (state)
Madison administration cabinet members
Members of the American Antiquarian Society
Members of the Virginia House of Delegates
James
People from Aldie, Virginia
People from Westmoreland County, Virginia
Presidents of the United States
United States Secretaries of State
United States Secretaries of War
United States senators from Virginia
University of Virginia people
Virginia Democratic-Republicans
Virginia lawyers
Virginia dynasty